Kouk Khmum is a khum (commune) of Thma Koul District in Battambang Province in north-western Cambodia.

Villages
Kouk Khmum contains eight villages.

References

Communes of Battambang province
Thma Koul District